Judah ben Kalonymus ben Moses of Mainz (died 1200) was a Jewish German scholar, halakhic authority, and kabbalist. In his early years, he studied in Speyer under Shemariah ben Mordecai who taught him mysticism. During the Third Crusade, Judah helped his community to prepare for the Anti-Semitic attacks to follow. Among his pupils were his son Eleazar of Worms, Joel ben Isaac ha-Levi and Baruch ben Samuel.

References 

Rabbis from Mainz
1200 deaths
Year of birth unknown
12th-century German rabbis
Kabbalists
12th-century German writers